Rogerville is an unincorporated community located in Mitchell County, Georgia, United States.

Geography
Rogerville is settled at the intersection of Radiator Road and John Collins Road. Millpond Road, Store Road, Tomato Road, Smith Road, Drew C. White Road, and Nicks Road run through the area.

References

Unincorporated communities in Georgia (U.S. state)
Unincorporated communities in Mitchell County, Georgia